Harrison Township is one of twelve townships in Bartholomew County, Indiana, United States. As of the 2010 census, its population was 3,823 and it contained 1,528 housing units.

Geography
Camp Atterbury borders the township to the north.

Cities, towns, villages
 Columbus (west edge)

Unincorporated towns
 Bethany
 Stony Lonesome
(This list is based on USGS data and may include former settlements.)

Adjacent townships
 Columbus Township (east)
 Wayne Township (southeast)
 Ohio Township (south)
 Van Buren Township, Brown County (southwest)
 Washington Township, Brown County (west)

Cemeteries
The township cemeteries are Haislup and Lawton.  Most of these have illegible grave markers and maintenance of the sites are the responsibility of the township trustee.

Major highways
  Indiana State Road 46

Lakes
 Lawsons Lake
 North Harrison Lake
 South Harrison Lake
 Tamerix Lake
 Youth Park Lake

Services
Harrison Township provides many of its own services or contracts them out. Residents have either Southwest Water Company supply water or have local wells. Electricity is provided by Duke, cable television by Comcast, and high-speed cable Internet access by Comcast.
    
Fire protection is provided by the Harrison Township Volunteer Fire Department (HTVFCO). 
EMS by Columbus Regional Hospital (CRH) Ambulance Service.
Law Enforcement is provided by Bartholomew County Sheriff Department.

School districts
 Bartholomew County School Corporation

Political districts
 Indiana's 6th congressional district
 State House District 59
 State Senate District 41

References

Citations

Sources
 United States Census Bureau 2007 TIGER/Line Shapefiles
 United States Board on Geographic Names (GNIS)
 United States National Atlas

External links

 Indiana Township Association
 United Township Association of Indiana

Townships in Bartholomew County, Indiana
Townships in Indiana